Karlsdottir is an Icelandic patronymic name.  People known by this name include the following:

Hanna María Karlsdóttir (born 1948), Icelandic actress 
Hólmfríður Karlsdóttir (born 1963), Icelandic former model and beauty queen

See also

Karlsdotter

Icelandic-language surnames